Dhun Jehangir Ruttonjee  (10 July 1903 – 28 July 1974) was a leader of the Indian community in Hong Kong. He was chairman of the Hong Kong Anti-Tuberculosis and Thoracic Diseases Association [zh] and a Legislative Councillor.

Ruttonjee was the son of businessman and philanthropist Jehangir Ruttonjee.

Biography
Ruttonjee was born in Hong Kong in 1903 to prominent Parsee Jehangir Hormusjee Ruttonjee. He attended St Joseph's College and was an undergraduate at the University of Hong Kong, although, like many of his fellows at the university before the war, he left early to join the family business.

One of Ruttonjee's sisters, Tehmi Ruttonjee-Desai, died of tuberculosis in 1943, spurring his father to found the Hong Kong Anti-Tuberculosis Association [zh] in 1948, of which Dhum Ruttonjee was chairman from 1964 until his death (succeeding Donovan Benson [zh], preceding Seaward Woo).<ref name=davis>The Royal Naval Hospital, Hong Kong, private website citing Harland, Kathleen, The Royal Navy in Hong Kong since 1841, Maritime Books, Liskeard, Cornwall, undated; and Melson, Commodore P.J., (ed.), '', Edinburgh Financial Publishing, Hong Kong, 1997</ref>

In 1942, during the Japanese occupation of Hong Kong, Ruttonjee family properties Dina House and Ruttonjee Building on Duddell Street were beleaguered by Japanese guards for several weeks. In 1944, Ruttonjee and his father were arrested, tortured and sentenced to five years' imprisonment, of which they served nine months before the liberation of the city. They were accused of aiding those at the Stanley Internment Camp and general anti-Japanese activity.

He was appointed Justice of the Peace after the war, in 1947. He was made an Unofficial member of the Legislative Council of Hong Kong in 1953. In the Council, he sat on the Kaitak Progress Committee alongside Ngan Shing-kwan and Charles Terry.  Ruttonjee was made Officer of the Order of the British Empire in 1957, and Commander in 1964, for public services. During the 1967 leftist riot, Ruttonjee was one of the earliest supporters of government crackdown among local elites. He served on the Legislative Council until 1968. He was known to often wear an orchid, a fact mentioned when he received the degree of Doctor of Laws honoris causa'' from the University of Hong Kong the next year. Ruttonjee died on 28 July 1974.

References

1903 births
1974 deaths
Alumni of the University of Hong Kong
Commanders of the Order of the British Empire
Hong Kong businesspeople
Hong Kong people of Parsi descent
Hong Kong philanthropists
Members of the Legislative Council of Hong Kong
20th-century philanthropists